A95 or A-95 may refer to:

 A95 road (Great Britain), a major road in the United Kingdom
 A 95 motorway (Germany)
 Canon PowerShot A95, a digital camera
 Dutch Defence, in the Encyclopaedia of Chess Openings
 MAN ND323F, a double decker bus model also known as the MAN A95